A punkah, also pankha  (Hindi:), is a type of fan used since the early 6th century BC. The word pankha originated from pankh, the wings of a bird which produce a draft when flapped.

In its original sense in South Asia, pankah typically describes a handheld fan made from a single frond of palm or a woven square of bamboo strips, rattan or other plant fibre, that can be rotated or fanned. These are called pankah in Hindustani. These small handheld devices are still used by millions when ceiling fans stop working during frequent power outages.

In the colonial age, the word came to be used in British India and elsewhere in the tropical and subtropical world for a large swinging fan, fixed to the ceiling, and pulled by a punkah wallah, during hot weather. To cover a larger area, such as in an office or a courthouse, a number of punkahs could be connected together by strings so that they would swing in unison. The material used could range from utilitarian rattan to expensive fabrics. The date of this invention is not known, but it was familiar to the Arabs as early as the 8th century. It was not commonly used in India before the end of the 18th century.

The electric fan largely supplanted it in barracks and other large buildings at the beginning of the 20th century.

The term was carried over to punkah louvre, to refer to the outlet for cool air in aircraft, particularly those over the passenger seats.

In India, the punkhawallah or pankha wallah  was the servant who operated the fan, often using a pulley system. 

In modern use, a person selling,  repairing or making fans, both handheld and electric, would also be known colloquially as a punkha wala, since the term means fan guy or the guy with the fans.

See also
Coolie
Wallah (disambiguation)

References

Cooling technology
Ventilation fans